Sweet's syndrome-like dermatosis is a cutaneous condition associated with bowel disorders.

See also 
 Sweet's syndrome
 List of cutaneous conditions

References 

Reactive neutrophilic cutaneous conditions